Kilema Kati is a town and ward in the Moshi Rural district of the Kilimanjaro Region of Tanzania. Its population according to the 2012 census was 6,993.

References

Wards of Kilimanjaro Region